Moses Bigelow (January 12, 1800 – January 10, 1874) was an American politician who served as the Mayor of Newark from 1857 to 1864.

References

1800 births
1874 deaths
Mayors of Newark, New Jersey
New Jersey Democrats